Homer "Si" Blankenship (August 4, 1902 – June 22, 1974) was a pitcher in Major League Baseball with the Chicago White Sox and Pittsburgh Pirates.

Blankenship, a Cherokee Native American, was born in Bonham, Texas, and attended high school in Ada, Oklahoma. He is a year younger than his brother Ted Blankenship, who pitched in the major leagues for 9 seasons.  Homer made his MLB debut for the White Sox in 1922, at the age of 20. He played in Chicago for parts of two seasons. Besides a short stint with the Pirates in 1928, he then pitched in the Texas League from 1926 to 1930. He won a career-high 17 games for the Shreveport Sports in 1926.

Blankenship retired from professional baseball in 1931. He died in 1974 in Longview, Texas.

References

External links

1902 births
1974 deaths
Major League Baseball pitchers
Chicago White Sox players
Pittsburgh Pirates players
Shreveport Sports players
Dallas Steers players
St. Joseph Saints players
Topeka Senators players
Baseball players from Texas
People from Bonham, Texas
American people of Cherokee descent
People from Ada, Oklahoma